was a Japanese professional baseball outfielder and first baseman in Nippon Professional Baseball.

Eto played for the Chunichi Dragons from 1959 to 1969, where he was the Central League batting champion in 1964 and 1965 (hitting .323 and .336 respectively). In addition, he was a Best Nine Award-winner as an outfielder five times: 1961, 1963, 1964, 1965, 1966, and 1968.

Eto moved to the Lotte Orions from 1970 to 1971 and the Taiyo Whales from 1972 to 1974. He was the player-manager of the Taiheiyo Club Lions in 1975. He returned to the Lotte Orions for his final season in 1976.

Eto died in 2008 of liver cancer at the age of 70. He was posthumously inducted into the Japanese Baseball Hall of Fame in 2010.

References

External links

Shinichi Eto at the Japanese Baseball Hall of Fame

1937 births
2008 deaths
Baseball player-managers
Chunichi Dragons players
Deaths from cancer in Japan
Deaths from liver cancer
Japanese baseball players
Lotte Orions players
Managers of baseball teams in Japan
Nippon Professional Baseball catchers
Nippon Professional Baseball first basemen
Nippon Professional Baseball outfielders
Taiheiyo Club Lions players
Taiyō Whales players
Seibu Lions managers
Baseball people from Kumamoto Prefecture
Japanese Baseball Hall of Fame inductees